David Farrow Maxwell (November 7, 1900 – October 1985) was the eightieth president of the American Bar Association.

Maxwell urged Congress to enact a measure that would grant tax advantages to self-employed lawyers and others who desire to set up voluntary pension plans.

References

1900 births
1985 deaths
Presidents of the American Bar Association
20th-century American lawyers